Monagas Sport Club is a Venezuelan professional football team competing at the top level, the Primera División Venezolana. It is based in Maturín. Their home stadium is the Estadio Monumental de Maturín. The club received the nickname of “Los Guerreros del Guarapiche” (The Warriors from the Guarapiche), because of the never giving up mentality of its players and the name of the river (River Guarapiche) which crosses the city where the team has its headquarters.

History 
Monagas Sport Club was founded on 23 September 1987 by Joaquín (Fariñas) da Silva, Ramón Ramírez,Enrique Polo, Rubén León, Francisco "Paco" Espinoza and Luis Enrique Rodríguez. Its first official match was against "Unión Deportivo Puerto la Cruz" on 22 May 1988; however the club had had friendly matches against the teams "Atlético Cumaná”, “Cachorros del Tigrito” and “Mariscales de Sucre”. The team started as a second division team and its first official league game, which it won with a final score of 4-0, was against the "Unión Deportivo Puerto La Cruz".

The team participated in the Venezuelan second division until 1990 when the club was promoted to the first division. Since then Monagas Sport Club have tried to remain in this division.

Crisis in the season 2006–07 
Monagas Sport Club obtained awful results in the season 2006–2007 of Venezuela's first division. As the consequence of this bad patch three previous coaches (Franco Fasciana, Del Valle Rojas and Bernardo Redín) had led the club before the arrival of Alí Cañas. Some football players resigned to the team before the conclusion of the tournament and Ramón Caballero, president of the club, gave up.

Monagas Sport Club finished in the relegation places at the end of the season, but the club won a reprieve when the Primera División Venezolana decided to expand from 10 to 18 teams, thus allowing the two teams in the relegation places to remain in the league.

2017 

In 2017, Monagas participated in the Primera División and qualified to the knockout stage of the Torneo Apertura, finishing 6th in the regular season. In the quarter-finals, they defeated Zamora 6–2 on aggregate and went on to the semi-finals, where they defeated Carabobo on away goals after a 1–1 draw on aggregate. In the final, Monagas faced Caracas. The first leg was played at Maturín on 25 June, with a 1–0 win for the home side. On the second leg in Caracas on 2 July, Monagas lost 2–1, but won on away goals (2–2 on aggregate), securing Monagas' first title in short tournaments and their first qualification to the Copa Libertadores. Later, on the Serie Final, against Torneo Clausura champions Deportivo Lara, Monagas lost the first leg in Maturín on 13 December, 1–0, but won the second leg in Cabudare on 17 December, 2–0, becoming the Venezuelan champions for the first time, winning the Serie Final 2–1 on aggregate.

Stadium

The Estadio Monumental de Maturin is a football stadium located in the city of Maturin, Monagas state. It is the biggest stadium in Venezuela with a capacity of 51,796 spectators. It is competing for the football matches that Monagas Sport Club home game. It was built to host the Copa America Venezuela 2007.

El Monumental was inaugurated on June 24, 2007, where they were the opening game between the Monagas Sport Club and Zamora Fútbol Club home team winning 2-0 with goals from Edder Farías.

Monagas Sport Club played from 1987 to 2007 at Estadio Alexander Botinni in Maturín.

Sponsor 
La Lotería de Oriente (a public lottery from Maturín) is the main sponsor of Monagas Sport Club. For last years the president of the lottery, Willy Farías, has been in charge of the presidency of the club.

Controversy over the uniform, the logo and the name of the club 
The colors of the Monagas Sport Club's uniform are blue and maroon. The uniform and crest are largely based on those of FC Barcelona. These colors were proposed by Francisco "Paco" Espinoza, a former vice-president of the club, in 1988.
In 2006 Ramón Caballero, the former president of the team, and other members of the board of directors suggested the colors of the uniform, the logo and the name of the club should be changed. According to them, the uniform and crest should not copy a foreign club and the name of the team should be written in Spanish. Many supporters of Monagas Sport Club are opposed to this idea as they consider the red and maroon colors, crest and current name to be a part of the club's identity.

Honours

 Primera División: 1 (2017)
 Torneo Apertura: 1 (2017)
 Torneo Clausura: 0

 Segunda División: 1 (2015)

Performance in CONMEBOL competitions
Copa Libertadores: 1 appearance
2018: Group stage

Copa Sudamericana: 4 appearances
2002: Second stage
2003: Preliminary round
2012: First stage
2019: First stage

Players

Current first team squad

Presidents and managers

Presidential history
Monagas Sport Club has had numerous presidents over the course of its history, some of whom have been owners of the club while others have been honorary presidents. Here is a complete list of them.

Managerial history

Below is a list of Monagas SC coaches from 1987 until the present day.

References

External links
Official site

Football clubs in Venezuela
Association football clubs established in 1987
1987 establishments in Venezuela
Maturín